Aurora borealis is a natural light display.

Aurora Borealis may also refer to:

Music
Aurora Borealis (band), a black metal band from Waldorf, Maryland, U.S.
Aurora (electronica band), a British electronic dance music group
Aurora Borealis (album), a 2004 album by Cloud Cult
Aurora Borealis (MCD), a 1996 EP by the Einherjer
"Aurora Borealis", a 2008 song by Celldweller from Soundtrack for the Voices in My Head Vol. 1
"Aurora Borealis", a song by The Griswolds
"Aurora Borealis", a 2012 song by Lemon Demon from I Am Become Christmas EP
"Aurora Borealis", a 1984 song by the Meat Puppets, from Meat Puppets II
"Aurora Borealis", a 1996 song by the 3rd and the Mortal, from Painting on Glass
"Aurora Borealis", a piano concerto by Geirr Tveitt

Other uses
Aurora Borelias (painting), an 1865 painting by Frederic Edwin Church
Aurora Borealis (film), a 2006 film
Aurora Borealis (icebreaker), a proposed European research icebreaker
Aurora Borealis, a type of rhinestone treated with aqua aura

See also
Borealis (disambiguation)